The Real Club de Tenis Barcelona - 1899 (meaning Royal Barcelona Tennis Club - 1899) is a private tennis club in Barcelona, Catalonia, Spain.  The facility has 18 clay courts, including a stadium court with a capacity of 8,400 and show court for 2,000 spectators.  Since moving to its current location in the northwest of the city in 1953, the club has hosted the Open Godó tournament, a part of the ATP World Tour's 500 Series.  Over the years, the club has hosted many Davis Cup ties of the Spanish team, including the Inter-Zonal final in 1965.

The first name of the club was Lawn-Tennis Club Barcelona. In 2017, the centre court was named "Pista Rafa Nadal" after the tennis great Rafael Nadal.

See also
 List of tennis stadiums by capacity

External links
Official website 

Tennis venues in Catalonia
Sports venues in Barcelona
Organisations based in Spain with royal patronage
Tennis clubs in Spain